Leucoptera laburnella (laburnum leaf miner) is a moth in the family Lyonetiidae. It is found in most of Europe, except the European part of Russia and the southern part of the Balkan Peninsula. It is also found in North America.

Description
The forewings are white; an oblique ochreous-yellow bar from costa beyond middle, edged with dark fuscous ; a nearly vertical ochreous-yellow costal spot before apex, edged with dark fuscous parallel lines ; beneath this a pale violet -golden -metallic post-tornal spot, edged on sides with black and above with yellowish ; apex yellowish ; three diverging dark fuscous bars in apical cilia. Hindwings are whitish. The larva is green-whitish.

Biology
The larvae feed on Astragalus, Chamaecytisus supinus, Genista tinctoria, Laburnocytisus adamii, Laburnum alpinum, Laburnum anagyroides, Lupinus polyphyllus and Petteria ramentacea (Fabaceae). They mine the leaves of their host plant. The mines are undistinguishable from those of Leucoptera genistae. The mine starts as a densely contorted corridor, that quickly turns brown. It is followed by a more or less straight corridor entirely filled with greyish-green frass. Then it widens into a round blotch that overruns the earlier corridor and in the end may occupy half of a leaflet. Pupation takes place outside of the mine.

References

Leucoptera (moth)
Leaf miners
Moths described in 1851
Moths of Europe
Moths of North America